Steve Harris (born December 3, 1965) is an American actor. He has played Eugene Young on the legal drama The Practice, Detective Isaiah "Bird" Freeman on the NBC drama Awake, and Charles McCarter in Tyler Perry’s Diary of a Mad Black Woman.

Early life 
Harris was born in Chicago, Illinois, the son of John Harris, a bus driver and  Mattie Harris, a housewife. He is the older brother of actor Wood Harris. He attended St. Joseph High School in Westchester, IL, a private school with a reputation for developing star athletes. Harris was a running back, and later played linebacker for Northern Illinois University, where he studied drama. His athletic career was cut short due to a torn ligament in his ankle. After graduating from Northern Illinois University in 1989, Harris obtained a master's degree in acting at the University of Delaware.

Career 
Harris appeared on Law & Order and earlier had a role in Homicide: Life on the Street's pilot. In 2006, he appeared in the now-cancelled TV series Heist. He also appeared in an episode of Grey's Anatomy. He appeared in several episodes of New York Undercover. He has appeared in a number of films including; Quarantine, Tyler Perry's Diary of a Mad Black Woman, Bringing Down the House, The Rock, The Mod Squad, Takers, and Minority Report.

Harris starred in actress Regina King's directorial debut Let The Church Say Amen which was adapted from ReShonda Tate Billingsley's 2005 best selling novel. The film premiered on Black Entertainment Television (BET) in 2013. He appeared in the TNT show Legends, which aired on TNT from August 13, 2014 to December 28, 2015, playing Nelson Gates, the boss of troubled FBI agent Martin Odum (Sean Bean).

Filmography

Film

Television

Awards
Harris was nominated six times for an NAACP Image Award for his work on The Practice and won in 2004.

References

External links 
 
 Steve Harris on TV Guide
 Steve Harris in NBAE

1965 births
African-American male actors
American male film actors
American male television actors
American male voice actors
Living people
Male actors from Chicago
Northern Illinois Huskies football players
Northern Illinois University alumni
University of Delaware alumni
21st-century African-American people
20th-century African-American people